Oliver Welden (1946 in Santiago, Chile – 31 January 2021) was an award-winning poet.

Career
In 1968, he received the Luis Tello National Poetry Award of the Society of Chilean Writers for Perro del Amor, a collection of 23 of his poems. In the 1960s, Welden and his wife,  Alicia Galaz Vivar, also published a poetry journal in Chile called Tebaida (Thebes).

Works in English
 Love Hound, trans. by Dave Oliphant, 2006, Host Publications, Inc.

References

External links
 Entry at Host Publications

1946 births
2021 deaths
Chilean male poets
Writers from Santiago
20th-century Chilean poets
20th-century Chilean male writers